Taylor Morrison is one of the largest home building companies in the United States. Its corporate headquarters are in Scottsdale, Arizona.

The company formed when Taylor Woodrow and Morrison Homes joined forces in July 2007. Taylor Morrison operates in Arizona, California, Colorado, Georgia, Florida, Illinois, North Carolina, South Carolina, Nevada, and Texas, building mid-to-upscale housing, as well as first-time and mid-market homes.

History
Taylor Woodrow was founded in 1921 by Frank Taylor and Jack Woodrow. They built a pair of modest semi-detached houses at 347 and 349 Central Drive, Blackpool in England. During the 1920s, Lord Taylor’s new company concentrated on providing low- cost, high quality housing in the Lancashire area. In the 1930s, Taylor Woodrow diversified into building temporary hospitals, etc., and thereby moved into general construction. In 1936 Taylor Woodrow entered the Canadian construction market through the acquisition of Monarch Development Corporation, founded in 1917, one of Canada’s oldest, largest and most diversified real estate companies. In 1953 the company purchased a controlling interest in a newly established business, Monarch Mortgage and Investments Limited, which owned land, apartment complexes, stores, and houses in the Toronto area, and in 1994, entered into the high-rise sector. Between 1945 and 2001 Taylor Woodrow's main operations were in general construction with Taylor Woodrow Homes only being a small part of the Group.

Morrison Homes was initially founded in Seattle in 1905 by C.G. Morrison and moved to northern California in 1946. The company built primarily first-time and midmarket home communities in Phoenix, Sacramento, Denver, Fort Myers, Jacksonville, Orlando, Sarasota, Tampa, Austin, and Houston. George Wimpey Plc acquired Morrison Homes in 1984 when it was based in San Francisco. George Wimpey's 2001 acquisition of Richardson Homes was later integrated under the Morrison brand.

On July 6, 2007, the United Kingdom-based parent companies of Morrison Homes Inc. and Taylor Woodrow Inc. joined. Taylor Woodrow Plc. and George Wimpey Plc. formed a new company, Taylor Wimpey Plc., becoming one of the world's largest home building companies.  Morrison Homes joined with Taylor Woodrow as part of the parent company formation.

The companies continued to operate under their existing brands until 2008, when they began to operate under the new Taylor Morrison brand.

In July, 2011, Taylor Morrison became a wholly owned subsidiary of TMM Holdings Limited Partnership, which is indirectly owned by investment funds separately managed by TPG Capital, Oaktree Capital Management, as well as JH Investments. It was taken public in 2013.

Bibliography

References

External links
 

Construction and civil engineering companies established in 2008
Companies based in Scottsdale, Arizona
Home builders
Companies listed on the New York Stock Exchange
2008 establishments in Arizona